Really From is the third and final studio album by American indie rock band Really From, released by Topshelf Records on March 12, 2021. It is the band's first album under their current name; they released two previous albums under their original name People Like You.

Reception

In a review for Pitchfork, Charley Ruddell said that "fusing bookish indie jazz with emo and math rock, the Boston quartet explores the complications of identity while dismantling stale indie-rock paradigms".

Ian Cohen of Stereogum said that "Really From was intended as a testament not just to their diversity of experience but their collaborative experience as well".

Track listing

Personnel
Chris Lee-Rodriguez – Vocals, Electric Guitar, Classical Guitar
Sander Bryce – Drum Set
Michi Tassey – Vocals, Piano, Keyboard, Synth Bass (Tracks 1 and 7)
Matt Hull – Trumpet, Flugelhorn, Trombone
Sai Boddupalli – Sound Design, Programming, Synth Bass (Tracks 2, 4-6, 8), Bass Guitar (Track 3)

References

2021 albums
Topshelf Records albums